Xuxa só Para Baixinhos 9 or Natal Mágico (also known as XSPB 9) is the thirty-second studio album and the twenty-fifth in Portuguese by singer and Brazilian presenter Xuxa, released by Sony Music on October 5, 2009. It is the ninth album in the collection Só Para Baixinhos.

Release and reception
Xuxa só Para Baixinhos 9 was released on October 5, 2009, the DVD sold more than 25,000 copies, receiving gold certification. XSPB 9 sold more than 50,000 copies and was one of the best selling albums in Brazil. The singles were "Papai Noel Existe", "Vem Chagando o Natal" and "Você Acredita em Mágica?". It was released in the formats DVD, CD, DVD + CD and DVD + CD + Projector Pen (the pack with the DVD and the CD and a pen that designs images of the Class of the Xuxinha).

The first format of the album to be released was the CD, which was released in Digipack format (which is considered a deluxe edition), and the only Xuxa CD that had been released in this format is the compilation Xuxa 20 Anos. The CD released on the DVD and CD pack includes 3 bonus tracks. This was the first album in the collection Só Para Baixinhos released by Sony Music, after Xuxa did not renew his contract with the record company Som Livre, in which he had released the first eight volumes of the series. At the end of 2010, the album was released on Blu-ray by Sony. The song "Você Acredita em Mágica" was part of the soundtrack of the film Xuxa em O Mistério de Feiurinha (2009).

Tour
Natal Mágico Tour is the fifteenth tour presenter and singer Xuxa Meneghel, the tour is based the album Xuxa só Para Baixinhos 9. The shows were held in Maracanãzinho, Rio de Janeiro and São Paulo. Unlike other tours, there is no sale of show tickets. They are carried out for children and adolescents from underprivileged communities in Rio de Janeiro and for children from the Xuxa Meneghel Foundation.

Through a promotion through Xuxa.com website (official website of Xuxa) fans can win tickets to the show. In 2010, the show held at Maracanãzinho was shown as a special Christmas of Xuxa on the night of December 24 and was later released on DVD in 2012, and the fourth tour Xuxa to have a record released. In 2014, several parts of the show held in São Paulo, including an exclusive interview granted Xuxa, were displayed as a Christmas special on Canal Viva. In every show, singers make appearances during the show, as Restart and Ivete Sangalo.

Track listing

Personnel
General and Artistic Direction: Xuxa Meneghel
Direction: Paulo de Barros
Production: Luiz Cláudio Moreira e Mônica Muniz
Production Director: Junior Porto
Musical production: Ary Sperling
Cinematography by: André Horta
Graphic project: Felipe Gois

Certifications

References

External links 
 Xuxa só para Baixinhos 9 at Discogs

2009 Christmas albums
2009 video albums
Xuxa video albums
Xuxa albums
Children's music albums by Brazilian artists
Portuguese-language video albums
Portuguese-language albums
Sony Music Christmas albums